Pak Gum-hyon (born 5 October 1964) is a North Korean speed skater. She competed in three events at the 1984 Winter Olympics.

References

1964 births
Living people
North Korean female speed skaters
Olympic speed skaters of North Korea
Speed skaters at the 1984 Winter Olympics
People from Chagang
Speed skaters at the 1986 Asian Winter Games